Limenarchis is a genus of moth in the family Gelechiidae.

Species
 Limenarchis pullata Bradley, 1961
 Limenarchis zonodeta Meyrick, 1926

References

Gelechiinae